Accordance with the Chinese Professional Baseball League current rules, the best head coach to win the overall championship awarded to the team's head coach, head coach of the Taiwan Major League winner of the best all media correspondent vote.

List of winners

See also

Chinese Professional Baseball League lists
Chinese Professional Baseball League awards
Baseball coaching awards